The Provincial Assembly of Sudurpashchim Pradesh also known as the Sudurpashchim Pradesh Sabha, (Nepali: सुदूरपश्चिम प्रदेश सभा) is a unicameral governing and law making body of Sudurpashchim Province, one of the seven Provinces in Nepal. The assembly is seated a Dhangadhi in Kailali District at the District Coordination Committee Hall. The assembly has 53 members of whom 32 are elected through first-past-the-post voting and 21 are elected through proportional representation. The term of the assembly is 5 years unless dissolved earlier

The present First Provincial Assembly was constituted in 2017, after the 2017 provincial elections. The election resulted in a majority for the alliance of CPN (Unified Marxist–Leninist) and CPN (Maoist Centre). The next election will take place when the five year term ends by November 2022.

History 
The Provincial Assembly of Sudurpashchim Province is under Article 175 of the Constitution of Nepal 2015 which guarantees a provincial legislative for each province in the country. The first provincial elections were conducted for all seven provinces in Nepal and the elections in Sudurpashchim was conducted for 53 seats to the assembly. The election resulted in a victory for the CPN (Unified Marxist–Leninist) and CPN (Maoist Centre) alliance which later went on to form a coalition government under Trilochan Bhatta from Maoist Centre. The first meeting of the provincial assembly was held on 4 February 2018. Arjun Bahadur Thapa from CPN (UML) was elected as the first speaker of the provincial assembly, and Nirmala Badal Joshi from Maoist Centre as the first deputy speaker of the provincial assembly.

List of assemblies

Committees 
Article 195 of the Constitution of Nepal provides provincial assemblies the power to form special committees in order to manage working procedures.

Political parties

See also 
 Sudurpashchim Province
 Provincial assemblies of Nepal

References 

Government of Sudurpashchim Province
Province legislatures of Nepal
Unicameral legislatures